Greece produces many food products.

Olive oil

Greece is the world's fifth ranked producer of olive oil, producing more than 1,079,000 tons of olive oil annually, more than 75% of that extra virgin. Greek olive oil is exported throughout the world.

Olive oil plays an important role in the Greek diet, being the basis of many dishes.

Honey
Honey in Greece is mainly flower-honey from the nectar of fruit and citrus trees (lemon, orange, bigarade trees), thyme honey, and pine honey from conifer trees.

Mastic
Mastic is grown on the Aegean island of Chios.

Alcoholic beverages
 Kitron: a liqueur from Naxos like limoncello, produced from citrons rather than lemons.
 Mastika: a liqueur from Chios seasoned with mastic, a resin gathered from the mastic tree, a small evergreen tree native to the Mediterranean.
 Ouzo: (a.c. ~ 40%) is an anise-flavored alcoholic aperitif similar to the French pastis and Turkish rakı.
 Tsikoudia: a pomace brandy from Crete, similar to tsipouro and rakı. 
 Tsipouro: a pomace brandy from mainland Greece and the northern Aegean, similar to tsikoudia and rakı. May or may not be anise-flavored.

Cheeses

 Anthotyros is a hard grating cheese made by aging mizithra.
 Feta: A semi-soft, crumbly, brined white cheese made from goat or sheep milk.
 Graviera: A Greek version of Gruyere, it is served with meals or used for grating and serving with pasta.
 Kasseri: a medium hard yellow cheese made from sheep or goat milk
 Kefalotyri: A hard and very salty cheese, used mainly for grating and serving with pasta.
 Manouri: An unsalted soft white cheese served on its own or used in savoury or sweet pies.
 Metsovone: A semi-hard smoked cheese traditionally produced in Metsovo.
 Mizithra: An unsalted soft cheese made from sheep milk. Served on its own or used in sweet or savoury pies. A slightly aged, sour version is called xynomizithra.

Cured meat

 Apaki: Cured pork from Crete.
 Kavourmas: Cured meat from northern Greece.
 Loukaniko: Pork sausage flavored with orange peel or fennel seed. May differ widely across Greece.
 Louza: Cured pork from Cyclades  
 Syglino: Cured ham from Mani, boiled in red wine and smoked.

Wine
Greece is a heavy producer and consumer of wine.

 Mavrodafni
 Retsina
 Xynomavro
 Vin santo

See also

 Economy of Greece
 Greek cuisine
 Greek restaurant

References

Greek cuisine
Food products